Jean Auguste Édouard Liénard (1779 in Paris – 10 February 1848 in Lille) was a French painter. He signed his works E.Liénard or J.Liénard.

A student of Regnault, Isabey and David, and worked for a long time as a painter of miniatures and portraits in Lille, where he succeeded François Watteau in 1823 as professor at the école des arts. He also worked for the  Manufacture nationale de Sèvres from 1828 to 1833. His own students included Victor Mottez.

External links 
 Works by Liénard

1779 births
1848 deaths
18th-century French painters
French male painters
19th-century French painters
Pupils of Jacques-Louis David
18th-century French male artists